Phanna Nikhom is a district (amphoe) of Sakon Nakhon province, Thailand.

Geography
Neighboring districts are (from the east clockwise) Mueang Sakon Nakhon, Kut Bak, Nikhom Nam Un, Waritchaphum, Phang Khon, Wanon Niwat and Akat Amnuai of Sakon Nakhon Province, and Na Wa of Nakhon Phanom province.

History
The area was originally known as Ban Phang Phrao (บ้านพังพร้าว). It was renamed Phanna Nikhom and made a district in 1902.

Administration 
The district is divided into 10 sub-districts (tambons), which are further subdivided into 123 villages (mubans). Phanna Nikhom is a township (thesaban tambon) which covers parts of tambon Phanna. There are a further 10 tambon administrative organizations (TAO).

References

Phanna Nikhom